Wang Hin is a district (amphoe) in the central part of Sisaket province, northeastern Thailand.

Geography
Neighboring districts are (from the north clockwise): Mueang Sisaket, Phayu, Phrai Bueng, Khukhan, Prang Ku, and Uthumphon Phisai.

History
The minor district (king amphoe) was created on 9 March 1987, when the five tambons, Bu Sung, That, Duan Yai, Bo Kaeo, and Si Samran were split off from Mueang Sisaket district. It was upgraded to a full district on 20 October 1993.

Administration
The district is divided into eight sub-districts (tambons), which are further subdivided into 126 villages (mubans). Bu Sung is a sub-district municipality (thesaban tambon) which covers the same-named sub-district and seven tambon administrative organizations (TAO).

References

External links
amphoe.com

Wang Hin